Marie-Geneviève Dupré, stage name Mademoiselle Grandval (1711–1783), was a French stage actress. 

She was engaged at the Comédie-Française in 1734. She became a Sociétaires of the Comédie-Française in 1734. She retired in 1760. 

She played grandes coquettes (great coquettes) and secondes amoureuses (secondary love heroines) as well as supporting roles in tragedies.

References

External links 
   Mademoiselle Grandval, Comédie-Française

1711 births
1783 deaths
18th-century French actresses
French stage actresses